Óscar Alexandre Whalley Guardado (born 29 March 1994) is a Spanish professional footballer who plays for CD Lugo as a goalkeeper.

Club career
Born in Zaragoza, Aragon, to an English father and a Spanish Mexican mother, Whalley spent his first season as a senior with Real Zaragoza's reserves in the Tercera División. On 31 May 2014, as first choice Leo Franco declared his desire to leave the country and understudy Pablo Alcolea was injured, he played his first match as a professional, starting in a 1–1 home draw against Sporting de Gijón in the Segunda División.

The following campaign, Whalley appeared in 19 games as Zaragoza came sixth, and a further one on 11 June 2015 as they lost their play-off semi-final first leg 3–0 at home to Girona FC. He was subsequently dropped for Bono for the rest of the tournament, as the team won the tie on away goals and lost the final by the same rule to UD Las Palmas.

On 10 July 2015, Whalley was loaned to neighbouring SD Huesca also in the second tier. On 8 August of the following year he signed with La Liga club Sporting Gijón, as third choice behind Iván Cuéllar and Diego Mariño.

Whalley moved abroad for the first time in his career on 12 June 2018, joining Danish Superliga side Aarhus Gymnastikforening. On 13 August 2019, he left for OFI Crete F.C. of the Super League Greece.

Whalley returned to Spain and its second division on 3 September 2020, after agreeing to a two-year contract with newly-promoted club CD Castellón. The following 25 July 2021, after suffering relegation, he joined CD Lugo in the same league.

International career
Whalley won his only cap for Spain at under-21 level on 12 November 2014, playing the second half of the 1–4 friendly loss to Belgium in Ferrol. He stated he would willingly accept a call up to the England national team if asked (being eligible through his father), and previously mentioned he preferred to represent them internationally; he was also eligible for Mexico through his mother.

References

External links

1994 births
Living people
Spanish people of English descent
Spanish people of Mexican descent
Sportspeople of Mexican descent
Spanish footballers
Footballers from Zaragoza
Association football goalkeepers
Segunda División players
Tercera División players
Real Zaragoza B players
Real Zaragoza players
SD Huesca footballers
Sporting de Gijón players
CD Castellón footballers
CD Lugo players
Danish Superliga players
Aarhus Gymnastikforening players
Super League Greece players
OFI Crete F.C. players
Spain under-21 international footballers
Spanish expatriate footballers
Expatriate men's footballers in Denmark
Expatriate footballers in Greece
Spanish expatriate sportspeople in Denmark
Spanish expatriate sportspeople in Greece